Calathea utilis is a species of plant in the Marantaceae family. It is endemic to Ecuador.  Its natural habitats are subtropical or tropical moist lowland forests and subtropical or tropical moist montane forests.

References

utilis
Endemic flora of Ecuador
Near threatened plants
Taxonomy articles created by Polbot